The Bailey Farm is an historic farm at 373 Wyatt Road in Middletown, Rhode Island. It was owned by members of the Bailey family, possibly as early as the late 17th century, into the 19th century. The original main house appears to be a mid-18th century structure that was given a significant Greek Revival treatment in the 19th century. It is a 1-1/2 story Cape style house, three bays wide, with a central chimney. The main entrance is centered on the northern facade, and is flanked by sidelight windows and pilasters, with an entablature above. The corners of the building are pilastered. A series of outbuildings stand nearby. There is a second complex of buildings on the northwest part of the property, built in the 1930s near the location of the Bailey family cemetery.

The farm was added to the National Register of Historic Places in 1984.

See also
National Register of Historic Places listings in Newport County, Rhode Island

References

Houses completed in 1838
Farms on the National Register of Historic Places in Rhode Island
Houses in Newport County, Rhode Island
Greek Revival houses in Rhode Island
Buildings and structures in Middletown, Rhode Island
National Register of Historic Places in Newport County, Rhode Island